The Illinois House of Representatives elections of 2006 determined the membership of the lower house of the 95th General Assembly.  The Democratic Party increased its Majority.

Overview 

2006 Illinois elections
Illinois House of Representatives elections
Illinois House